"The Deep Blue Sea" is a 1954 British TV play based on the play by Terence Rattigan starring Kenneth More, reprising his role on stage.

it was performed twice, first on 17 January 1954 and again on the 21st, as part of Sunday Night Theatre.

Cast
 Googie Withers as	Hester Collier
 Kenneth More as Freddie Page
 Peter Illing as Mr. Miller
 Robert Harris as Sir William Collyer
 Raymond Francis as Jackie Jackson
 Dandy Nichols as Mrs. Elton
 David Aylmer as Philip Welch
 Gillian Lutyens as Ann Welch

Reception
The program was popular and seen by 11 million people.

The Birmingham Mail called it "one of those rare productions that are utterly sure of themselves." The Evening Standard called it "sensitive and efficient." The Evening Standard said "it is difficult to find words to praise it enough."

More later played the role again in a 1955 film version.

References

External links
 

British television plays
BBC television dramas
1954 television plays
Sunday Night Theatre